The Fall of Princes is a long poem by English poet John Lydgate. It is based on Giovanni Boccaccio's work De Casibus Virorum Illustrium, which Lydgate knew in a French translation by Laurent de Premierfait, entitled Des Cas des nobles hommes et femmes.  Lydgate's poem was written in the years 1431-38. It is composed of nine books and some 36 thousand lines. It is made up of rhyme royal stanzas:

Out of her swoone when she did abbraide,
Knowing no mean but death in her distrèsse,
To her brothèr full piteously she said,
"Cause of my sorrowe, roote of my heavinesse,
That whilom were the sourse of my gladnèsse,
When both our joyes by wille were so disposed,
Under one key our hearts to be enclosed.—

The poem tells about lives and tragic deaths of many historical and legendary persons. A sixteenth-century poem The Mirror for Magistrates by various authors is a sequel to The Fall of Princes.

References

External links
 scans of the version edited by Dr. Henry Bergen, published 1923-1927 for the Early English Text Society: 
Part I (Introduction and Books I and II)
Part II (Books III-V)
Part III (Books VI-IX)
Part IV (Bibliographic Introduction, Notes, and Glossary)
 e-text version of the EETS edition (poem text only, without Dr. Bergen's introduction or notes)

Middle English poems
Adaptations of works by Giovanni Boccaccio